The 2021 Sun Belt Conference football season was the 21st season of college football play for the Sun Belt Conference. The season began September 2, 2021 and concluded with its championship game on December 4, 2021. It was part of the 2021 NCAA Division I FBS football season. The Sun Belt Conference consists of 10 football members split into two divisions. The conference released its schedule on March 1, 2021.

Previous season

The 2020 season saw Coastal Carolina win the East Division, while Louisiana won the West Division. The Conference Championship game was cancelled due to the COVID-19 pandemic, and the two teams were declared co-champions. Coastal Carolina advanced to the Cure Bowl, where they lost in overtime to Liberty. Louisiana advanced to the First Responder Bowl, where they defeated UTSA.

Appalachian State, Georgia Southern, and Georgia State also advanced to bowl games, with all winning their respective matches.

Preseason

Preseason Media Poll
The Preseason Media Poll was released on July 20. Coastal Carolina and Appalachian State tied as the favorites for the East Division, while Louisiana was favored to win the West Division.

Preseason awards
The following list contains players and coaches included on preseason watch lists for national awards.

Preseason All-Conference teams
Offensive Player of the Year: Grayson McCall (Redshirt Sophomore, Coastal Carolina quarterback)
Defensive Player of the Year: Carlton Martial (Junior, Troy linebacker)

Head coaches
Prior to the season, Arkansas State, Louisiana–Monroe, and South Alabama saw coaching changes. At Arkansas State, Butch Jones was named head coach after previous head coach Blake Anderson left the team to take the head coach position with Utah State of the Mountain West Conference. At Louisiana–Monroe, Terry Bowden took over as head coach after Matt Viator was fired by the school. At South Alabama, Kane Wommack took over as head coach after previous head coach Steve Campbell was fired by the school.

Mid-Season changes
On September 26, Georgia Southern announced that they had fired Chad Lunsford. Georgia Southern named cornerbacks coach Kevin Whitley as the interim head coach. Former USC head coach Clay Helton was later announced as the permanent replacement for Lunsford beginning in 2022. 
On November 21, Troy announced that they had fired Chip Lindsey. Troy named defensive coordinator Brandon Hall as the interim head coach. On December 3, the school announced Kentucky defensive coordinator Jon Sumrall as the new permanent head coach.

Post-season changes
On November 28, Billy Napier announced that he would become the new head coach at Florida in the Southeastern Conference starting in 2022. On December 5, Louisiana promoted assistant head coach Michael Desormeaux to head coach, beginning with the school's season-ending bowl game.

Rankings

Schedule

All times Central time.

Week 1

Week 2

Week 3

Week 4

Week 5

Week 6

Week 7

Week 8

Week 9

Week 10

Week 11

Week 12

Week 13

Championship Game

Week Fifteen (Sun Belt Championship Game)

Postseason

Bowl Games

Sun Belt records vs other conferences

2021–2022 records against non-conference foes:

Sun Belt vs Power 5 matchups
This is a list of games the Sun Belt has scheduled versus power conference teams (ACC, Big 10, Big 12, Pac-12, BYU, Notre Dame and SEC). All rankings are from the current AP Poll at the time of the game.

Sun Belt vs Group of Five matchups
The following games include Sun Belt teams competing against teams from the American, C-USA, MAC, or Mountain West.

Sun Belt vs FBS independents matchups
The following games include Sun Belt teams competing against FBS Independents, which includes Army, Liberty, New Mexico State, UConn, or UMass.

Sun Belt vs FCS matchups

Awards and honors

Player of the week honors

Sun Belt Individual Awards
The following individuals received postseason honors as voted by the Sun Belt Conference football coaches at the end of the season.

All-Conference Teams
The following players were selected as part of the Sun Belt's All-Conference Teams.

All-Americans

The 2021 College Football All-America Teams are composed of the following College Football All-American first teams chosen by the following selector organizations: Associated Press (AP), Football Writers Association of America (FWAA), American Football Coaches Association (AFCA), Walter Camp Foundation (WCFF), The Sporting News (TSN), Sports Illustrated (SI), USA Today (USAT) ESPN, CBS Sports (CBS), FOX Sports (FOX) College Football News (CFN), Bleacher Report (BR), Scout.com, Phil Steele (PS), SB Nation (SB), Athlon Sports, Pro Football Focus (PFF) and Yahoo! Sports (Yahoo!).

Currently, the NCAA compiles consensus all-America teams in the sports of Division I-FBS football and Division I men's basketball using a point system computed from All-America teams named by coaches associations or media sources.  The system consists of three points for a first-team honor, two points for second-team honor, and one point for third-team honor.  Honorable mention and fourth team or lower recognitions are not accorded any points.  Football consensus teams are compiled by position and the player accumulating the most points at each position is named first team consensus all-American.  Currently, the NCAA recognizes All-Americans selected by the AP, AFCA, FWAA, TSN, and the WCFF to determine Consensus and Unanimous All-Americans. Any player named to the First Team by all five of the NCAA-recognized selectors is deemed a Unanimous All-American.

NFL Draft

The following list includes all Sun Belt players who were drafted in the 2022 NFL Draft.

References